Liberal High School is the name of more than one educational institution.

United States
Liberal High School (Kansas) in Liberal, Kansas
Liberal High School (Missouri) in Liberal, Missouri